SB-236057 is a compound which is a potent and selective inverse agonist for the serotonin receptor 5-HT1B, acting especially at 5-HT1B autoreceptors on nerve terminals. It produces a rapid increase in serotonin levels in the brain, and was originally researched as a potential antidepressant. However subsequent research found that SB-236,057 also acts as a potent teratogen, producing severe musculoskeletal birth defects when rodents were exposed to it during pregnancy. This has made it of little use for research into its original applications, yet has made it useful for studying embryonic development instead.

References 

5-HT1B antagonists
Teratogens
Oxadiazoles
Abandoned drugs